Striking Poses is a 1999 American direct-to-video thriller film directed by Gail Harvey and starring Shannen Doherty as a paparazzo photographer who becomes a photography victim herself, of a dangerous stalker. It is rated R for violence and profanity.

Plot
The film opens with a disturbed woman (Doherty) trying to bury a shirt covered in blood, and then checking into a motel under a fake ID, 'Julie Summerfield'. She is quickly located by two detectives (Feore and D'Aquila), who reveal her true identity, Gage Sullivan. Gage then reveals that she is a freelance photographer with desires of becoming a news photographer, though eventually becomes a paparazzi because it earns more money and she happens to be good at it (despite despising the job). Soon, she starts being harassed by an unknown person who photographs her. Furthermore, he breaks into her house and leaves traces of his presence to scare her. Gage warns the police, but they are not too invested with her reports. She decides to focus on her job, cheating her way into a private health club where she catches soap opera star April Indigo (Green) snorting cocaine. As she uses the help of her assistant Casey Roper (Gorski) to leave the party, she becomes the target of her stalker yet again, as he follows her as she leaves and takes photographs of her.

Terrified, she uses the help of a security man named Nick Angel (Griffin) to help her change her identity, in hopes of getting rid of her stalker. After helping her change her name to Julie Summerfield, she finds out that one of his old friends, now murdered, was one of her photography victims years earlier. As they prepare the next day to create a new life, they are bothered by Murray "Gadger" Buck (Devine), a hit man who makes an impression with his psychotic behavior. That night, she and Nick break into the library to learn more about Julie Summerfield, and when they return home, Gage finds one of the stalker's trademarks at her door. Inside, they cannot find the stalker or her assistant, who should have been present in the house. The next morning, Gage receives pictures of Casey being mutilated and murdered. Devastated, she visits Gadger, asking him to kill her stalker. He asks for $150,000 in exchange, and orders her to find a place far away from people, where the deed can be done, as well as advising her to keep Nick out of it.

Meanwhile, Nick has broken into Gadger's apartment, where he finds out that Gadger is the same man as Gage's stalker and Casey's killer. He immediately sets out to the abandoned house, where Gage at the moment is being scared by Gadger's behavior. As Nick enters the house, Gadger feels betrayed by Gage and shoots Nick. He then orders Gage to take care of his bloody clothes, and check into a motel. Back in present time, the detectives work with Gage to locate Badger. They retrieve his location, where she finds out that Nick, Casey and Gadger worked together as con artists who planned everything. The detectives and Gage decide to take revenge by conning them themselves. Gage goes over to Gadger's place, claiming that she received photographs of Nick's murder. As she learns through listening wire that the three con artists are turning on each other, she meets with Gadger again, telling him that the person who took pictures of Nick's murder, is demanding $250,000.

On the night of the money exchange, Linus poses as the threatener. Gage uses loose blanks to shoot and "kill" Linus, which she does to scare off Linus, whom she orders to leave the money and get away. With her money back, she starts to celebrate, until she finds out that Linus is not responding to anything. Worried about having killed him, she takes the money and gets away. Gadger, meanwhile, reveals himself to be an associate of Valerie, to whom he returns with all the money. Valerie then blows up his car and turns to Casey and Nick, who shoot and kill Valerie. Gage also arrives at the scene to collect her money, and finds Nick and Casey trying to kill each other in order to not having to share the cash. Casey eventually kills Nick, and tries to murder Gage, but instead accidentally sets herself on fire. Gage is able to flee from a burning building, but does not inform the authorities, thus faking her own death. She uses the identity of 'Margaret Mudge' and enjoys her newly found wealth, acquired by the conned money, as well as the heritage of the real Margaret Mudge.

Cast
Shannen Doherty as Gage Renee Sullivan/Julie Summerfield/Margaret Mudge
Joseph Griffin as Nick Angel
Tamara Gorski as Casey Roper
Aidan Devine as Murray "Gadger" Buck (the stalker)
Colm Feore as Detective Linus Stahl
Diane D'Aquila as Detective Valerie Button
Janet-Laine Green as April Indigo

References

External links
 

1999 direct-to-video films
1999 thriller films
1999 films
American thriller films
American independent films
1999 independent films
1990s English-language films
1990s American films